This is a list of '''San Diego Toreros football players in the NFL Draft.

Key

Selections

References

San Diego

San Diego-related lists
San Diego Toreros NFL Draft